Lohai Malhar is a small village and tehsil of Kathua district in the union territory of Jammu and Kashmir, India. It is located about 85 km north of the district headquarters at Kathua.

Geography
Lohai Malhar has an average elevation of 1200 metres in the Sivalik Hills range of Himalaya. It has an area of 364.35 square kilometres and a population of 47,973.

Towards west Lohai Malhar shares a boundary with Dansal Tehsil of Udhampur district, towards east with Ghordi Tehsil and Ramnagar Tehsil towards the east.

Places to visit
Sukrala Mata Temple

Nearby places
Bhilawar, Machedi Badnota Malad

See also
 Basohli
 Hiranagar
 Nagri Parole

References

Villages in Lohai Malhar tehsil